Robert Burnaby Park Disc Golf Course is a 10-hole disc golf course located in Burnaby, British Columbia, Canada. The course was designed by Jim Brown in 1999. It is one of only a handful of disc golf courses in the Vancouver area.

See also 
 List of disc golf courses in British Columbia

References

External links 

 
 Course map
 DG Course Review profile
 PDGA Course Directory profile

Disc golf courses in British Columbia